Swimming will be competed as a medal sport in the 2011 Commonwealth Youth Games in the Isle of Man from September 9 to 11, 2011 in the National Sports Centre. Each Commonwealth Games Association can send up to two athletes per event, including one relay team. In the Games, age limits set by the Fédération Internationale de Natation for world Junior competitions will be followed, according to which the age limit for boys is set to 15–18 years (means swimmers born in 1993, 1994, 1995 and 1996) and for girls its 14–17 years of age (means swimmers born in 1994, 1995, 1996 and 1997). 
All swimming events are done in short course meters.

Results

Boys' events

Girls' events

References

External links

2011 in swimming
2011 Commonwealth Youth Games events